Events in the year 1957 in Turkey.

Parliament
 10th Parliament of Turkey (up to 1 Nov)
 11th Parliament of Turkey

Incumbents
President – Celal Bayar
Prime Minister – Adnan Menderes
Leader of the opposition – İsmet İnönü

Ruling party and the main opposition
  Ruling party – Democrat Party (DP) 
  Main opposition – Republican People's Party (CHP)

Cabinet
22nd government of Turkey (up to 25 December)
23rd government of Turkey (from 25 December)

Events
 24–25 April – 1957 Fethiye earthquakes
 26 May - 1957 Abant earthquake
30 June – Ministry of Industry was established
2 July – Osman Bölükbaşı, the chairman of Republican Nation Party was arrested
25 September – Operation Deep Water, a big NATO exercise around Çanakkale. 
 27 October – General elections (DP 419 seats, CHP 173 seats CMP 4 seats, HP 4 seats)
 20 October – Yarımburgaz train disaster, the worst train accident with 95 dead and 150 wounded people
25 November – Ministry of Tourism was established
28 November – Liberty Party (HP) was merged to Republican People's Party (CHP)

Births
8 February, Mehmet Ali Erbil, showman and actor
25 April – Bedri Baykam, painter
1 August – Sırrı Sakık, politician
23 September – Tunch Ilkin, footballer and broadcaster (died 2021)
22 October – Ahmet Kaya, singer
1 November – Erkan Can, theatre actor
4 November – Zerrin Özer, singer
18 November – Ali Nesin, mathematician

Deaths
17 May – Nurullah Ataç (born in 1898), essayist and literary critic
1 October – Abdülhalik Renda (born in 1881), former government minister and the speaker of Parliament
13 November – Nuri Demirağ (born in 1886), industrialist and the founder of National Development Party
9 December – Ali İhsan Sabis (born in 1882), retired general
17 December – Hüseyin Cahit Yalçın (born in 1875), journalist, writer

Gallery

References

 
Years of the 20th century in Turkey
Turkey
Turkey
Turkey